4Q107 ( or 4QCantb) is a fragment of the Song of Songs (2:9‑17; 3:1‑2, 5, 9‑11; 4:1‑3, 8‑11, 14‑16; 5:1) in Hebrew found in Cave 4 at Qumran in the West Bank and which comprises part of the Dead Sea Scrolls.  From the palaeography (script) on the fragment it has been identified as being early-Herodian,  i.e. c.30 BCE-30 CE. The scribe responsible for 4Q107 did not write 4Q108 as there are differences in writing style. Also, the lacuna in the second column of 4Q107 does not provide enough space to accommodate 4Q108.

The fragments which make up the Song of Songs found at Qumran are called 4Q106, 4Q107, 4Q108, and 6Q6. The scroll 4Q240 is possibly a commentary on the Song of Songs.

See also
 List of Hebrew Bible manuscripts
Dead Sea Scrolls
4Q106
4Q108
4Q240
6Q6
Tanakh at Qumran

References

External links
4Q107 at the Leon Levy Dead Sea Scrolls Digital Library

Dead Sea Scrolls
1st-century BC biblical manuscripts